Fuel (stylized in all uppercase as FUEL) is an open world racing video game developed by Asobo Studio and published by Codemasters. The game was released in 2009 in North America on June 2 and Europe on June 5 for PlayStation 3 and Xbox 360, and July 5 for Microsoft Windows. In the free roaming mode, the game features the ability to drive anywhere in the game world without incurring loading times; however, crashing a vehicle – or invoking the reset function to return to the road – does invoke a loading screen.

Gameplay
Fuel is an open world racing game set in a Mad Max-like post-apocalyptic world ravaged by extreme weather fueled by global warming, with players experiencing varying weather effects such as occasional tornadoes and sandstorms, as well as an accelerated day-night cycle. The map in which the game takes place is over 14,400 square kilometers large.

Development

Fuel evolved from a game Asobo Studio announced in 2005, called Grand Raid Offroad.

The award for largest playable area in a console game was awarded to Fuel developer Asobo Studios. Guinness World Records presented the developer with a certificate to commemorate the achievement.

Reception

Fuel has been met with mixed reviews, praising the graphics and the world design. Many of the rewards available to be unlocked were seen as not worth the effort and the racing mechanics have been noted as sloppy, with the AI opponents leading for most of the race only to slow down towards the end to allow the player to win.

References

External links

Fuel at MobyGames

2009 video games
Asobo Studio games
Codemasters games
Games for Windows certified games
Guinness World Records
Multiplayer and single-player video games
Off-road racing video games
Open-world video games
PlayStation 3 games
Post-apocalyptic video games
Racing video games
Racing video games set in the United States
Video games developed in France
Windows games
Xbox 360 games